Guy Shelton Frazier (born July 20, 1959) is a former American football linebacker who played professionally in the National Football League (NFL) played for the Cincinnati Bengals from 1981 to 1984 and the Buffalo Bills from 1985 to 1986. He played college football at the University of Wyoming. He played high school football at Cass Technical High School, graduating in 1977. Frazier was selected in the fourth round of the 1981 NFL Draft by the Bengals and returned to Detroit in 1982 as a rookie with the Cincinnati Bengals in Super Bowl XVI. Frazier made the first hit of the game against the San Francisco 49ers on the opening kickoff causing a fumble that was recovered by teammate John Simmons. That was the first time in Super Bowl history that a turnover occurred on the opening kickoff. The Bengals unable to capitalize on the turnover and subsequently lost.

References

1959 births
Living people
American football linebackers
Buffalo Bills players
Cincinnati Bengals players
Wyoming Cowboys football players
Cass Technical High School alumni
Players of American football from Detroit